Okenia hallucigenia is a species of sea slug, specifically a dorid nudibranch, a marine gastropod mollusc in the family Goniodorididae.

Etymology
This species was named because of its resemblance to the shape of the Cambrian fossil Hallucigenia.

Distribution
This species was described from Australia. It is known from central New South Wales north to Northern Australia and on the west coast south to Kimberley in Western Australia.

Description
This Okenia has a narrow body and long lateral papillae. The body is bright pink and just the tips of the mantle processes, the gills and the rhinophores are a deeper pink.

Ecology
The diet of this species is the bryozoan Pleurotoichus clathratus. This sea slug is very similar to Okenia stellata, and can be found with that species on the same food. There are two other species from southern Japan, the Marshall Islands, the Philippines and Indonesia which are also similar to this species, and those are Okenia nakamotoensis and Okenia kondoi.

References

Goniodorididae
Gastropods described in 2004